Leo Sayer is the self-titled sixth album by English singer-songwriter Leo Sayer, and released in 1978.

The song "I Can't Stop Loving You (Though I Try)" later became a hit when Phil Collins recorded it in 2002.

Track listing

Side one
"Stormy Weather" (Leo Sayer, Tom Snow)
"Dancing the Night Away" (Russell Smith, James H. Brown, Jr.) (Amazing Rhythm Aces cover)
"I Can't Stop Loving You (Though I Try)" (Billy Nicholls)
"La Booga Rooga" (Andy Fairweather Low) (Andy Fairweather Low cover)
"Raining in My Heart" (Felice and Boudleaux Bryant) (Buddy Holly cover)

Side two
"Something Fine" (Jackson Browne) (Jackson Browne cover)
"Running to My Freedom" (Tom Snow, Johnny Vastano)
"Frankie Lee" (Sayer, Ray Parker Jr.)
"Don't Look Away" (Sayer, Snow)
"No Looking Back" (Sayer, Snow)

Personnel
Leo Sayer – guitar, harmonica, vocals, background vocals
Ben Benay – guitar
Ollie E. Brown – percussion
Jackson Browne – performer
Lindsey Buckingham – guitar, vocals on "Something Fine"
Michael Carnahan – horn
Lenny Castro – percussion, conductor
Bill Champlin – vocals, background vocals
Scott Edwards – bass guitar
Andy Fairweather-Low – performer
Richard Felts – horn
Jim Gilstrap – vocals, background vocals
Jay Graydon – guitar
Davey Johnstone – guitar
Bobby Kimball – vocals, background vocals
Russ Kunkel – drums
David Lindley – mandolin, violin, steel guitar
Steve Lukather – guitar, electric guitar
James Newton Howard – clavinet
David Paich – piano, keyboards
Ray Parker Jr. – guitar
Dean Parks – guitar
Greg Phillinganes – piano, keyboards
Jeff Porcaro – drums, percussion
Steve Porcaro – synthesizer
Chuck Rainey – bass guitar
Tom Saviano – saxophone
Leland Sklar – bass guitar
Tom Snow – piano, background vocals
James Stroud – producer, drums, synthesizer programming
Fred Tackett – guitar
Waddy Wachtel – guitar, electric guitar

Production
Record producer: Richard Perry
Horn arrangements: Tom Saviano
Engineer: Bill Schnee

Charts

References

External links
 

1978 albums
Albums produced by Richard Perry
Chrysalis Records albums
Leo Sayer albums
Warner Records albums